Josiah-Jordan James (born September 5, 2000) is an American college basketball player for the Tennessee Volunteers of the Southeastern Conference (SEC).

High school career
James played high school basketball for Porter-Gaud School in Charleston, South Carolina. He was named Gatorade Player of the Year in South Carolina after averaging 29.1 points, 12.4 rebounds, 5.3 blocks and 4.9 assists per game. James led the team to three state titles. He set Porter-Gaud's single game scoring record with 45 points in the Cyclones’ 84–49 win against Northwood Academy. He was named a McDonald's All-American.

Recruiting
James was considered a five-star recruit by Rivals and ESPN and a four-star recruit by 247Sports. On September 19, 2018, he committed to play college basketball for Tennessee over offers from Clemson, Duke, and Michigan State.

College career
James missed much of the preseason with a hip injury. He scored seven points in Tennessee's first two games. In a 75–62 win over Washington, James finished with nine points, five assists and four rebounds. On January 4, 2020, James scored a career-high 15 points on 5-of-11 shooting in a 78–64 loss to LSU. He was ruled out with a hip injury on January 30. As a freshman, James averaged 7.4 points, 5.5 rebounds, and 2.9 assists per game. On January 30, 2021, he suffered a wrist injury against Kansas, forcing him to miss two games. As a sophomore, James averaged 8.0 points and a team-leading 6.5 rebounds per game. He underwent wrist surgery in the offseason.

National team career
James played for the United States under-18 basketball team at the 2018 FIBA Under-18 Americas Championship. He helped his team win the gold medal.

Career statistics

College

|-
| style="text-align:left;"| 2019–20
| style="text-align:left;"| Tennessee
| 27 || 26 || 29.9 || .370 || .367 || .778 || 5.5 || 2.9 || .9 || .9 || 7.4
|-
| style="text-align:left;"| 2020–21
| style="text-align:left;"| Tennessee
| 25 || 17 || 27.0 || .390 || .308 || .778 || 6.5 || 2.0 || 1.4 || 1.0 || 8.0
|-
| style="text-align:left;"| 2021–22
| style="text-align:left;"| Tennessee
| 32 || 30 || 29.0 || .388 || .324 || .800 || 6.0 || 1.7 || 1.4 || 1.1 || 10.3
|- class="sortbottom"
| style="text-align:center;" colspan="2"| Career
| 84 || 73 || 28.7 || .383 || .329 || .787 || 6.0 || 2.2 || 1.3 || 1.0 || 8.7

References

External links
Tennessee Volunteers bio
USA Basketball bio

2000 births
Living people
American men's basketball players
Basketball players from South Carolina
McDonald's High School All-Americans
Point guards
Sportspeople from Charleston, South Carolina
Tennessee Volunteers basketball players